The 1893 Penn State football team was an American football team that represented Pennsylvania State College—now known as Pennsylvania State University–as an independent during the 1893 college football season. The team was coached by George Hoskins. It was first team to play on Beaver Field, Penn State football's first permanent home.

Schedule

References

Penn State
Penn State Nittany Lions football seasons
Penn State football